Mudar is a northern Arab tribal grouping. It may also refer to:

People
Mudar (name), list of people with the name

Other uses
 Mudhar Club (handball), a handball club
 Diyar Mudar, medieval Arabic name of the westernmost of the three provinces of al-Jazira
 Mudar language